Beloved Enemy is a 1955 West German historical drama film directed by Rolf Hansen and starring Ruth Leuwerik, Werner Hinz and Thomas Holtzmann. The film's plot was loosely inspired by the Fashoda Incident of 1898.

The film's sets were designed by the art director Robert Herlth. It was shot at the Bavaria Studios in Munich, with location filming taking place in Cairo and the Saqqara.

Synopsis
In a Sudanese city located on the Nile, the British consul encourages his wife to cultivate the acquaintanceship of a Sergeant in the French Foreign Legion in the hope she can find out about French military plans in the region.

Cast
 Ruth Leuwerik as Violante Gore
 Werner Hinz as Gerald Gore, englischer Konsul
 Thomas Holtzmann as Sergeant Charly Brown
 Gustav Knuth as Soldat Horner
 Bruni Löbel as Aimée, Kabarettistin
 Rolf Henniger as Hauptmann Jules Ambéry
 Hans Quest as Ward, Sekretär bei Gore
 Hilde Weissner as Mrs. Trapp
 Friedrich Domin as Mr. Trapp
 Lina Carstens as Mrs. Durham
 Otto Brüggemann as Major Gontard
 Erika Remberg as Nadja
 Wolf Ackva as Allaine, französischer Konsul
 Adolf Ziegler as Caldwell, Butler bei Gore
 Brigitte Stanzel as Bessy Gore, die Tochter
 Wolf-Dieter Maurer as Ronald Gore, der Sohn
 Leonard Steckel as Oberst Junot

References

Bibliography 
 Hans-Michael Bock and Tim Bergfelder. The Concise Cinegraph: An Encyclopedia of German Cinema. Berghahn Books, 2009.

External links 
 

1955 films
West German films
1950s German-language films
Films directed by Rolf Hansen
Films shot at Bavaria Studios
Films shot in Egypt
Films set in Egypt
Films set in Sudan
Films set in the 1890s
German historical drama films
1950s historical drama films
1955 drama films
German black-and-white films
1950s German films